There are about 220 known moth species of Rwanda. The moths (mostly nocturnal) and butterflies (mostly diurnal) together make up the taxonomic order Lepidoptera.

This is a list of moth species which have been recorded in Rwanda.

Arctiidae
Afrasura peripherica (Strand, 1912)
Afrasura violacea (Cieslak & Häuser, 2006)
Afroarctia bergeri Toulgoët, 1978
Afroarctia histrionica Toulgoët, 1978
Afroarctia kenyana (Rothschild, 1933)
Afrojavanica kostlani (Gaede, 1923)
Afrospilarctia lucida (Druce, 1898)
Agaltara nebulosa Toulgoët, 1979
Alpenus nigropunctata (Bethune-Baker, 1908)
Amata alicia (Butler, 1876)
Amata chrysozona (Hampson, 1898)
Amata tomasina (Butler, 1876)
Amerila bubo (Walker, 1855)
Amerila luteibarba (Hampson, 1901)
Amerila thermochroa (Hampson, 1916)
Amphicallia pactolicus (Butler, 1888)
Apisa fontainei Kiriakoff, 1959
Apisa subargentea Joicey & Talbot, 1921
Balacra compsa (Jordan, 1904)
Balacra rattrayi (Rothschild, 1910)
Carcinarctia laeliodes Hampson, 1916
Cragia quadrinotata (Walker, 1864)
Cyana hecqi Karisch & Dall'Asta, 2010
Cyana paramargarethae Karisch & Dall'Asta, 2010
Disparctia varicolor Toulgoët, 1978
Galtara aurivilii (Pagenstecher, 1901)
Galtara convergens Toulgoët, 1979
Galtara elongata (Swinhoe, 1907)
Galtara laportei Toulgoët, 1979
Galtara reticulata (Hampson, 1909)
Galtara turlini Toulgoët, 1979
Kiriakoffalia costimacula (Joicey & Talbot, 1924)
Mecistorhabdia haematoessa (Holland, 1893)
Metarctia flavicincta Aurivillius, 1900
Metarctia flora Kiriakoff, 1957
Metarctia forsteri Kiriakoff, 1955
Metarctia insignis Kiriakoff, 1959
Metarctia lateritia Herrich-Schäffer, 1855
Metarctia paremphares Holland, 1893
Metarctia rubripuncta Hampson, 1898
Metarctia rufescens Walker, 1855
Paralpenus wintgensi (Strand, 1909)
Pericaliella melanodisca (Hampson, 1907)
Popoudina pamphilia Kiriakoff, 1958
Pseudogaltara inexpectata Toulgoët, 1978
Pseudothyretes perpusilla (Walker, 1856)
Pusiola straminea (Hampson, 1901)
Radiarctia melanochoria Hering, 1932
Rhipidarctia crameri Kiriakoff, 1961
Rhipidarctia forsteri (Kiriakoff, 1953)
Rhipidarctia subminiata Kiriakoff, 1959
Seydelia turlini Toulgoët, 1976
Spilosoma sulphurea Bartel, 1903
Teracotona multistrigata Joicey & Talbot, 1924
Teracotona pallida Joicey & Talbot, 1924
Teracotona translucens (Grünberg, 1907)
Teracotona wittei (Debauche, 1942)
Thumatha brunnea Kühne, 2007
Trichaeta fulvescens (Walker, 1854)
Utetheisa pulchella (Linnaeus, 1758)

Bombycidae
Racinoa spiralis Kühne, 2008

Brahmaeidae
Dactyloceras barnsi (Joicey & Talbot, 1924)

Crambidae
Ancylolomia capensis Zeller, 1852
Ancylolomia gracilis Fawcett, 1917
Ancylolomia planicosta Martin, 1956
Angustalius malacellus (Duponchel, 1836)
Autocharis sinualis (Hampson, 1899)
Pyrausta flavimarginalis (Hampson, 1913)

Eupterotidae
Janomima mariana (White, 1843)

Geometridae
Acrostatheusis ruandana Herbulot, 1991
Adicocrita aciculata Herbulot, 1983
Antharmostes papilio Prout, 1912
Antharmostes tutsiana Herbulot, 1996
Asthenotricha anisobapta Prout, 1932
Asthenotricha grandis Herbulot, 1997
Bathycolpodes acutissima Herbulot, 1986
Biston edwardsi (Prout, 1938)
Blaboplutodes missilorum Prout, 1934
Cartaletis melanopis Prout, 1929
Chiasmia geminilinea (Prout, 1932)
Chrysocraspeda hyalotypa (Prout, 1932)
Cleora pavlitzkiae (D. S. Fletcher, 1958)
Cleora rostella D. S. Fletcher, 1967
Ectropis anisoides Herbulot, 1981
Ectropis ocellata Warren, 1902
Encoma irisaria Swinhoe, 1904
Epigynopteryx venosa Herbulot, 1984
Eupithecia dilucida (Warren, 1899)
Eupithecia turlini Herbulot, 2001
Eupithecia tutsiana Herbulot, 2001
Hypochrosis banakaria (Plötz, 1880)
Hypocoela turpisaria (Swinhoe, 1904)
Hypomecis nessa Herbulot, 1995
Idiodes flexilinea (Warren, 1898)
Idiodes pectinata (Herbulot, 1966)
Isoplenodia arabukoensis Sihvonen & Staude, 2010
Mesomima tenuifascia (Holland, 1893)
Piercia subrufaria (Warren, 1903)
Pingasa distensaria (Walker, 1860)
Prasinocyma leucocycla Herbulot, 1982
Prasinocyma semicincta Herbulot, 1982
Prasinocyma turlini Herbulot, 1982
Pseudolarentia megalaria (Guenée, 1858)
Psilocerea praecoca Herbulot, 1981
Racotis angulosa Herbulot, 1973
Rhodophthitus tricoloraria (Mabille, 1890)
Scopula suda Prout, 1932
Victoria perornata Warren, 1898
Victoria subhyalina Herbulot, 1982
Xanthisthisa tarsispina (Warren, 1901)
Xanthorhoe ansorgei (Warren, 1899)
Xanthorhoe exorista Prout, 1922
Xanthorhoe heliopharia (Swinhoe, 1904)
Xanthorhoe procne (Fawcett, 1916)
Xanthorhoe transcissa (Warren, 1902)
Xanthorhoe transjugata Prout, 1923
Xanthorhoe trientata (Warren, 1901)
Xylopteryx amieti Herbulot, 1973
Xylopteryx anodina Herbulot, 1984
Xylopteryx bifida Herbulot, 1984
Xylopteryx clathrata Herbulot, 1984
Xylopteryx dargei Herbulot, 1984
Xylopteryx turlini Herbulot, 1984
Zamarada bastelbergeri Gaede, 1915
Zamarada canina Herbulot, 1983
Zamarada delta D. S. Fletcher, 1974
Zamarada dentata D. S. Fletcher, 1958
Zamarada metrioscaphes Prout, 1912
Zamarada montana Herbulot, 1979
Zamarada plana Bastelberger, 1909
Zamarada ruandana Herbulot, 1983

Gracillariidae
Corythoxestis aletreuta (Meyrick, 1936)
Phyllonorycter adderis de Prins, 2012
Phyllonorycter gato de Prins, 2012
Phyllonorycter ipomoellus de Prins, 2012
Phyllonorycter umukarus de Prins, 2012

Lasiocampidae
Lechriolepis gyldenstolpei Aurivillius, 1927
Leipoxais tolmera Tams, 1929
Pachytrina flamerchena Zolotuhin & Gurkovich, 2009
Pachytrina philargyria (Hering, 1928)
Philotherma apithana Hering, 1928
Stoermeriana graberi (Dewitz, 1881)

Lemoniidae
Sabalia jacksoni Sharpe, 1890

Lymantriidae
Aroa discalis Walker, 1855
Crorema adspersa (Herrich-Schäffer, 1854)
Dasychira chorista Hering, 1926
Eudasychira georgiana (Fawcett, 1900)
Euproctis cryphia Collenette, 1960
Euproctis nessa Swinhoe, 1903
Euproctis pallida (Kirby, 1896)
Homochira ruandana Hering, 1926
Laelia eutricha Collenette, 1931
Laelia rogersi Bethune-Baker, 1913
Leucoma parva (Plötz, 1880)
Mylantria xanthospila (Plötz, 1880)
Neomardara africana (Holland, 1893)
Porthesaroa noctua Hering, 1926
Ruanda aetheria Strand, 1909

Metarbelidae
Mountelgonia pagana (Strand, 1909)

Noctuidae
Achaea finita (Guenée, 1852)
Acontia imitatrix Wallengren, 1856
Aegocera obliqua Mabille, 1893
Aegocera rectilinea Boisduval, 1836
Ametropalpis vidua (Holland, 1894)
Callopistria maillardi (Guenée, 1862)
Carpostalagma chalybeata Talbot, 1929
Crameria amabilis (Drury, 1773)
Cyligramma fluctuosa (Drury, 1773)
Dichromia mutilata (Strand, 1909)
Eudocima fullonia (Clerck, 1764)
Feliniopsis laportei Hacker & Fibiger, 2007
Heraclia aemulatrix (Westwood, 1881)
Heraclia superba (Butler, 1875)
Masalia galatheae (Wallengren, 1856)
Mazuca elegantissima Janse, 1939
Meristides umbripennis Strand, 1909
Mitrophrys menete (Cramer, 1775)
Oraesia wintgensi (Strand, 1909)
Soloe splendida Toulgoët, 1980
Sphingomorpha chlorea (Cramer, 1777)
Trigonodes hyppasia (Cramer, 1779)
Ulotrichopus pseudocatocala (Strand, 1918)

Notodontidae
Antheua delicata Bethune-Baker, 1911
Antheua gallans (Karsch, 1895)
Antheua trifasciata (Hampson, 1909)
Boscawenia rectangulata (Gaede, 1928)
Desmeocraera analis Kiriakoff, 1954
Epidonta duplicata Kiriakoff, 1962
Epidonta inconspicua Kiriakoff, 1962
Epimetula albipuncta (Gaede, 1928)
Pseudobarobata angulata Gaede, 1928
Rhenea mediata (Walker, 1865)
Scrancia leucopera Hampson, 1910

Pterophoridae
Platyptilia rhyncholoba Meyrick, 1924

Pyralidae
Aglossa basalis Walker, 1865
Ematheudes neonepsia Martin, 1956

Saturniidae
Lobobunaea acetes (Westwood, 1849)
Lobobunaea ansorgei (Rothschild, 1899)
Lobobunaea jeanneli Rougeot, 1959
Lobobunaea turlini Lemaire, 1977
Orthogonioptilum adiegetum Karsch, 1892
Pselaphelia vandenberghei Bouyer, 1992
Tagoropsis rougeoti D. S. Fletcher, 1952
Urota centralis Bouyer, 2008

Sphingidae
Dovania poecila Rothschild & Jordan, 1903
Hippotion eson (Cramer, 1779)
Macroglossum trochilus (Hübner, 1823)
Macropoliana ferax (Rothschild & Jordan, 1916)
Nephele monostigma Clark, 1925
Temnora scheveni Carcasson, 1968
Temnora subapicalis Rothschild & Jordan, 1903
Temnora turlini Darge, 1975

Thyrididae
Lamprochrysa scintillans (Butler, 1893)
Marmax vicaria (Walker, 1854)

Tineidae
Cimitra fetialis (Meyrick, 1917)
Cimitra horridella (Walker, 1863)
Cubitofusa pseudoglebata (Gozmány, 1967)
Dasyses centralis Gozmány, 1967
Hapsifera glebata Meyrick, 1908
Hapsifera revoluta Meyrick, 1914
Perissomastix lala Gozmány, 1967
Perissomastix pyroxantha (Meyrick, 1914)

Tischeriidae
Tischeria kuehnei Mey, 2010

Tortricidae
Cochylimorpha exoterica (Meyrick, 1924)
Thaumatotibia leucotreta (Meyrick, 1913)
Trachybyrsis euglypta Meyrick, 1927

Zygaenidae
Epiorna abessynica (Koch, 1865)

See also
List of birds of Rwanda
List of butterflies of Rwanda
List of mammals of Rwanda

References

External links 

Moths
Moths
Rwanda
Rwanda